Boletus barrowsii, also known in English as the white king bolete after its pale colored cap, is an edible and highly regarded fungus in the genus Boletus that inhabits western North America. Found under ponderosa pine and live oak in autumn, it was considered a color variant of the similarly edible B. edulis for many years.

Taxonomy and naming
It was officially described by American mycologists Harry D. Thiers and Alexander H. Smith in 1976 from a specimen collected near Jacob Lake, Arizona, on August 21, 1971, by amateur mycologist Charles "Chuck" Barrows, who had studied the mushroom in New Mexico. It was previously held to be a white colour form of Boletus edulis. A 2010 molecular study found that B. barrowsii was sister to a lineage that gave rise to the species B. quercophilus of Costa Rica and  B. nobilissimus of eastern North America.

Description
The cap is 6–25 cm (2–10 in) in diameter, initially convex in shape before flattening, with a smooth or slightly tomentose surface, and gray-white, white or buff color. The thick flesh is white and does not turn blue when bruised. The pores are initially whitish, later yellow. The spore print is olive brown, the spores are elliptical to spindle-shaped and 13–15 x 4–5 μm in dimensions. The stout stipe is white with a brown reticulated pattern, and may be 6–20 cm (–8 in) high with an apical diameter of 2–6 cm (1–2 in). Like B. edulis, it is often found eaten by maggots. It has a strong odor while drying.

Distribution and habitat
The white king bolete is ectomycorrhizal, found under ponderosa pine (Pinus ponderosa) inland, and  coast live oak (Quercus agrifolia) closer to the west coast. Fruit bodies appear after rain, and will be more abundant if this occurs in early autumn rather than later in the year through to winter. It is abundant in the warmer parts of its range, namely Arizona and New Mexico, but also occurs in Colorado, west into California and north to British Columbia. It has been recorded from the San Marcos Foothills in Santa Barbara County.

Edibility
The species is edible and highly regarded in New Mexico, Arizona, and Colorado, and was eaten for many years while assumed to be a form of B. edulis.

Similar species 
In addition to B. edulis, the species could also be confused with the similarly pale-capped Boletus satanas, though the flesh of the latter stains blue when cut or bruised, and it has a reddish stem and pores. The latter species is poisonous when raw.

See also
List of Boletus species
List of North American boletes

References

Edible fungi
barrowsii
Fungi described in 1976
Fungi of North America
Taxa named by Harry Delbert Thiers
Taxa named by Alexander H. Smith